Under United States tax law, the standard deduction is a dollar amount that non-itemizers may subtract from their income before income tax (but not other kinds of tax, such as payroll tax) is applied. Taxpayers may choose either itemized deductions or the standard deduction, but usually choose whichever results in the lesser amount of tax payable. The standard deduction is available to individuals who are US citizens or resident aliens. The standard deduction is based on filing status and typically increases each year. It is not available to nonresident aliens residing in the United States (with few exceptions, for example, students from India on F1 visa status can use the standard deduction). Additional amounts are available for persons who are blind and/or are at least 65 years of age. 

The standard deduction is distinct from the personal exemption, which was eliminated by the Tax Cuts and Jobs Act of 2017 for tax years 2018–2025.

Basic standard deduction
The applicable basic standard deduction amounts for tax years 2006–2023 are as follows:

Other standard deduction in certain cases
The standard deduction may be higher than the basic standard deduction if any of the following conditions are met:
 The taxpayer is 65 years of age or older.
 The taxpayer's spouse is 65 years of age or older.
 The taxpayer is blind (generally defined as not having corrected vision of at least 20/200 or as having extreme "limitation in the fields of vision").
 The taxpayer's spouse is blind (see definition above).

For each applicable condition, a taxpayer adds $1,500 to his/her standard deductions (for 2023).  However, the additional deduction is $1,850 for unmarried individuals who are not qualifying surviving spouses.

For dependents, the standard deduction is equal to earned income (that is, compensation for services, such as wages, salaries, or tips) plus a certain amount ($400 in 2023).  A dependent's standard deduction cannot be more than the basic standard deduction for non-dependents, or less than a certain minimum ($1,250 in 2023).

Consider the following examples:

References 

1040 Instruction Booklet for year 2005, Page 36.

External links
Internal Revenue Service Website

United States federal income tax
Tax terms